Ramesh Dahal (Nepali: रमेश दहाल ) is a Nepali songwriter and lyricist. He was born in 1978  in Mainapokhari, Dolakha. He writes songs in various genres including modern, patriotic, pop, and folk music, and has published two collections of his song lyrics.

Early life and education 
Dahal spent his childhood at Charikot, Dolakha. His father wrote song lyrics which he also performed, which served as an inspiration. 

He graduated from Kalinchwok Secondary School in 1995. He has studied civil engineering, and he has Master's degrees in sociology and business studies; he also studied environmental science and policy at Clark University.

Writing
He started writing song lyrics as a teenager in 1990, when he was still at school. In 2000, his first song 'Pheri Timro Samjnale' was recorded; in the following year, the song "Phool Ko Thunga" with music by Ram Thapa and lyrics by Dahal was recorded for Radio Nepal. He has recorded more than 300 songs, and published two collections of his songs.  He won the Nationwide Modern Song competition organized by Radio Nepal in 2009 and again in 2020.

He has published articles about the effect of music and its role in society, in English and Nepali newspapers. He has published two anthologies of lyrical poems, named Baluwako Ghar and Hiunko Phool. 

His song lyrics focus on social issues, such as the concept of chhaupadi (menstrual taboo), and patriotic themes. 

He has cited the works of Madhav Prasad Ghimire, Rajendra Thapa, Kiran Kharel, and Bhairab Nath Rimal 'Kadam', as well as English language song writers Sam Cooke and Bob Dylan, as sources of inspiration.

References

External link
Official Site

Nepalese songwriters
Nepalese lyricists
Living people
English-language writers from Nepal
Nepali-language writers from Nepal
Year of birth missing (living people)